Apple Music is a music, audio and video streaming service developed by Apple Inc. Users select music to stream to their device on-demand, or they can listen to existing playlists. The service also includes the Internet radio stations Apple Music 1, Apple Music Hits, and Apple Music Country, which broadcast live to over 200 countries 24 hours a day. The service was announced on June8, 2015, and launched on June30, 2015. New subscribers get a one-month free or six months free trial with the purchase of select products before the service requires a monthly subscription.

Originally strictly a music service, Apple Music began expanding into video in 2016. Executive Jimmy Iovine has stated that the intention for the service is to become a "cultural platform", and Apple reportedly wants the service to be a "one-stop shop for pop culture". The company is actively investing heavily in the production and purchasing of video content, both in terms of music videos and concert footage that support music releases, as well as web series and feature films.

The original iOS version of Apple Music received mixed reviews, with criticism directed towards a user interface deemed "not intuitive". However, it was praised for its playlist curation, a vast library of songs to stream, and its integration with other Apple devices and services. In iOS 10, the app received a significant redesign, which received positive reviews for an updated interface with less clutter, improved navigation, and a bigger emphasis on users' libraries. Apple Music gained popularity rapidly after its launch, passing the milestone of 10million subscribers in only six months. Though Apple does not disclose the amount of paid subscribers, research firm Midia Research estimated it at 78 million . As of October 2022, Apple Music reached the 100 million songs milestone in its streaming catalog in October 2022.

Description 
Apple Music allows users to stream over 90 million songs to their device on demand. The service offers curated playlists by music experts and recommendations tailored to a users music preference. The service provides three live 24-hour radio stations: Apple Music 1, led by DJ Zane Lowe, Apple Music Hits, and Apple Music Country, which is broadcast in over 100 countries.  The Apple Music Radio service is free for all users, even without an Apple Music subscription. Apple Music subscribers can create a profile to share their music with friends and follow other users to view the music they're listening to on a regular basis. Apple Music's use of iCloud, which matches a users' songs to those found on the service, allows users to combine their iTunes music library with their Apple Music library and listen to their music all in one place. Additionally, the service is heavily integrated into Apple's own in-house services such as their personal voice assistant Siri as well as their audio and video streaming protocol AirPlay. As of late 2019, users also have the ability to access the full version of Apple Music through an Apple-designed web player in beta.

Apple Music's interface consists of five tabs: "Library", "Listen Now", "Browse", "Radio", and "Search". The "Library" tab shows the user's music collection, with options to view songs by "Playlists", "Artists", "Albums", "Songs", or "Downloaded Music". Below these options, the tab also shows music recently added to the user's library. The "Listen Now" tab recommends music for the user based on their music tastes. Human expert selections supplement the algorithmic curation, while users are able to "Like" and "Dislike" songs to further improve music suggestions. "Browse" shows new album releases from artists, playlists curated by the Apple Music team, upcoming album releases, as well as different categories including "Genres", "Moods", "Top Charts", and "Music Videos". The "Radio" tab incorporates Apple Music Radio and other radio stations which play genre-specific or artist-related music, depending on the user's preference. The radio feature in Apple Music allows users to skip songs, view previously played songs on the station, as well as view songs playing next. The "Search" tab features a search box where users can search for artists, albums, Apple Music users, or songs by name or by lyrics. Below the search box, a list of recent user searches and overall trending searches on the service are shown.

When a song is playing, a "Now Playing" bar appears above the bottom navigation bar. When viewed, the Now Playing section allows users to add a song to their library, download it to their device, and like or dislike the song to improve suggestions on the "Listen Now" tab. Other functions of the "Now Playing" section include the ability to control what music plays next and put songs on shuffle or repeat. Additionally, users can view live lyrics of the song they are listening to through the now playing card, which displays the song's lyrics live in sync with the time while it plays to the user.

Each artist page includes a profile banner and a "Play" button which automatically creates a radio station based around the artist. Artist pages also include sections for their featured releases, albums, singles, top songs, and background information. Apple Music users can create their own profile on the service, thus allowing them to follow other users and see what music their followers are listening to.

Users also have the ability to view their most played songs, artists, and albums of the entire year through a feature called Apple Music Replay, accessible on the "Listen Now" tab.

The service is compatible with iOS devices running version 8.4 or later, iPadOS devices running version 13.0 or later, Music app on macOS Catalina or later, iTunes version 12.2 or later for Windows PCs, as well as Apple Watch, Apple TV, Apple CarPlay, and Apple HomePod. It is also available for Android devices running version 4.3 or later, ChromeOS devices, Amazon Echo devices, and Sonos speakers. For devices without a native application, Apple Music is available on the web with a web player in beta. On October 27, 2021, Sony announced that Apple Music would become available on the PlayStation 5. On October 12, 2022, Apple Music became available for the Xbox One and Xbox Series X/S.

History

Preparation 
Before Apple Music, the company's iPod and iTunes were known for having "revolutionized digital music." Former Apple CEO Steve Jobs was known to be opposed to the idea of music subscription services. When Apple bought audio equipment maker Beats Electronics in 2014, Apple gained ownership of Beats' own service Beats Music, and made Beats Music CEO Ian Rogers responsible for the iTunes Radio service. Business Insider later reported that Apple was planning to merge the two services. Apple also hired noted New Zealand born British radio DJ Zane Lowe to serve as a music curator.

After a period of rumors and anticipation, Sony Music CEO Doug Morris confirmed on June 7, 2015, that Apple had plans to announce a music streaming service, saying "It's happening tomorrow," with the launch later in the month. Morris emphasized several times that he prefers paid streaming as opposed to ad-supported, from a financial perspective. Furthermore, Morris said he expects the service to be the "tipping point" to accelerate the growth of streaming, along with arguing that Apple has "$178 billion dollars in the bank. And they have 800 million credit cards in iTunes." as opposed to Spotify, which "never really advertised because it’s never been profitable". Morris further argued that "Apple will promote this like crazy and I think that will have a halo effect on the streaming business. A rising tide will lift all boats. It's the beginning of an amazing moment for our industry."

Royalty payment policy 
Shortly before Apple Music was released, singer-songwriter Taylor Swift wrote an open letter publicly criticizing Apple's decision to not reimburse artists during a user's free trial period and announced that she would be holding back her album 1989 from the service. She said the policy was "unfair" as "Apple Music will not be paying writers, producers, or artists for those months". UK independent record label Beggars Group also criticized the trial period, saying it struggled "to see why rights owners and artists should bear this aspect of Apple's customer acquisition costs".

The day after Swift's letter, Apple Senior Vice President of Internet Software and Services Eddy Cue announced on Twitter that Apple had changed its policy, and that Apple Music "will pay artist for streaming, even during customer's free trial period". On Twitter, Swift wrote "After the events of this week, I've decided to put 1989 on Apple Music... And happily so". She concluded saying it was "the first time it's felt right in my gut to stream my album".

Record label cartel 
In negotiations with record labels for the new service, Apple allegedly attempted to encourage record labels to pull their content from the free, ad-supported tiers of competing services such as Spotify and Amazon Music in order to drive adoption of Apple Music and offered an incentive to Universal Music Group to pull its content from YouTube. The U.S. Department of Justice and Federal Trade Commission launched an investigation into this alleged cartel in May 2015.

Announcement and launch 
The announcement happened as the signature "one more thing..." reveal at Apple's conference. Hip hop artist Drake appeared onstage at the announcement event to elaborate on how he used the Connect platform, and Apple subsequently emphasized how "unsigned artists can share their music on Connect, too", in contrast to the iTunes Store, where small, independent artists were finding it difficult to participate.

Apple Music launched on June 30, 2015, in 100 countries. Earlier, new users used to receive a three-month free trial subscription, which changed to a monthly fee after three months. The trial lasts for a month now. A family plan allows six users to share a subscription at a reduced rate. Apple originally sought to enter the market at a lower price point for the service, but the music industry rejected the plan. The service debuted as an updated Music app on the iOS 8.4 update. Apple TV and Android device support was planned for a "fall" 2015 launch. A previously unreleased song by Pharrell Williams, entitled "Freedom", was used in promotional material and announced as an exclusive release on the launch of the service. The "History of Sound" advert for the launch of the Apple Music service was soundtracked by the tune There Is No Light by Wildbirds & Peacedrums, from their 2009 album The Snake. Upon its launch, Beats Music subscriptions and playlists were migrated to Apple Music, and the service was discontinued.

In May 2016, a student membership was announced, that discounted the regular price of a subscription by 50%. The student plan was initially only available for eligible students in the United States, United Kingdom, Germany, Denmark, Ireland, Australia, and New Zealand, but was expanded to an additional 25 countries in November 2016.

In February 2016, Music Business Worldwide reported that, with Apple Music having launched in Turkey and Taiwan in the previous week, the service was available in 113 countries. The publication further wrote that those countries accounted for 59 regions that competing service Spotify did not. In August 2016, Apple Music was launched in Israel and South Korea.

On April 21, 2020, Apple announced that Apple Music would be expanding to an additional 52 countries around the world bringing the total to 167 worldwide.

User growth 
In January 2016, Fortune reported that, six months after launching, Apple Music had reached 10 million paying subscribers, having spent six months reaching the same customer base that took competing music streaming service Spotify six years. This customer base increased to 11 million subscribers in February, 13 million in April, 15 million in June, 17 million in September, 20 million in December, 27 million in June 2017, 36 million in February 2018, 38 million in March 2018 (just five weeks after the previous milestone), 40 million in April 2018, 50 million as of May 2018, 56 million as of December 2018, and 60 million as of June 2019.

By July 2018, Apple Music had surpassed Spotify in the number of paying users in the United States.

Expansion into video 
In October 2015, Drake and Apple signed a deal to release the music video for “Hotline Bling” exclusively on Apple Music. In December, Apple released an exclusive Taylor Swift tour documentary, called The 1989 World Tour Live, on Apple Music. In February 2016, The Hollywood Reporter reported that Dr. Dre would be starring in and executive producing a "dark semi-autobiographical drama" called Vital Signs. The production was described as "Apple's first scripted television series". Recode subsequently reported a few days later that the announcement of Dr. Dre's production was an effort to "extend Apple Music" in promotional ways rather than Apple actively exploring original television content. Citing Apple's deals with Drake and Swift in October and December 2015, respectively, the report referenced a Twitter user describing Apple's efforts as "content marketing".

In July 2016, Apple bought Carpool Karaoke from The Late Late Show with James Corden, with Variety writing that Apple was planning to distribute the series through Apple Music. Apple's adaptation of the series was originally supposed to premiere in April 2017, but was delayed without explanation. The series instead premiered on August 8, 2017.

In January 2017, The Wall Street Journal reported that Apple was exploring original video content, including its own television series and movies. A few days later, Apple Music executive Jimmy Iovine confirmed the reports about the move towards video, and in February, he announced that Apple Music would launch its first two television-style series in 2017, with the aim to turn Apple Music into a "cultural platform". In March, The Information reported that Apple had recently hired several people to help evolve its video platform, including YouTube product manager Shiva Rajaraman. In April, it was announced that Apple Music would be the exclusive home to Sean Combs's documentary "Can't Stop, Won't Stop: A Bad Boy Story", which premiered June 25. On the same day, Bloomberg Businessweek reported that artist Will.i.am would make a reality show for Apple Music, in an effort to turn the service into a "one-stop shop for pop culture". The reality show was later revealed to be called Planet of the Apps, and will focus on the "app economy". The series has cast 100 developers, and premiered on June 6, 2017.

In June 2017, Apple hired two television executives from Sony, Jamie Erlicht and Zack Van Amburg. The two have jointly held the title of "President" at Sony, and have helped develop shows including Breaking Bad and Shark Tank. The hiring was noted by the media as another significant effort by Apple to expand into original video productions. In early December 2017, Apple hired Michelle Lee, a programming veteran, as a creative executive of Apple's original video team, and a few days later, also hired Philip Matthys and Jennifer Wang Grazier from Hulu and Legendary Entertainment, respectively.

On October 19, 2020, Apple launched Apple Music TV via Apple Music and the Apple TV app in the United States. Apple Music TV is a free, continuous 24/7 livestream focused on music videos, akin to the early days of MTV. Apple Music TV plans on having premieres of new music videos occur every Friday at 12PM ET, as well as occasional artist and themed takeovers, airings of Apple Music original documentaries and films, live events and shows, and chart countdowns. The service launched with a countdown of the 100 most streamed songs in the US of all time on Apple Music. On May 17, 2022, Apple Music announced Apple Music Live, a new concert series that kicks off with Harry Styles live from New York on May 20.

Price changes 
On October 19, 2021, Apple introduced the discounted Apple Music Voice plan at $4.99/month, which limits subscribers to only accessing the service's music library and playback features through Siri.

On June 24, 2022, Apple Music increased the price of its student plan, available for eligible college students, from $4.99 to $5.99 per month in the U.S. It represented the first price increase for any plan since Apple Music’s launch in the country. Similar price increases also occurred to student plans in the U.K. and Canada at the same time. On October 24, 2022, Apple announced it was to increase pricing of standard Apple Music subscriptions (along with Apple TV+ and Apple One) in many regions. The Individual plan increased $1 to $10.99/month, the Family plan increased $2 to $16.99/month, and the Annual plan for individuals increased $10 to $109/year.

Availability on other platforms 
In November 2015, Apple launched the Android version of Apple Music, touted by reporters as Apple's first "real" or "user-centric" Android app. The app was updated in April 2017 to match the service's iOS 10 design. On November 30, 2018, Apple added support for Apple Music on Amazon Echo speakers, after previously only being accessible on Apple's own HomePod speakers.

On September 5, 2019, Apple released the first version of an Apple Music web player in beta. The web player gives users full access to their music libraries along with similar features from the Apple Music app, while it is missing key features that are expected to be added later. A Windows 11 app was released in beta in January 2023, to replace the aging iTunes for Windows.

Other developments 
Apple has added personalized music playlists to the service, with the September 2016 launch of “My New Music Mix”, and the June 2017 launch of "My Chill Mix".

On December 13, 2018, Apple discontinued Apple Music's "Connect" feature in favor for their redesigned approach to artist profiles and the ability for users to share their music and playlists with friends and followers introduced in iOS 11.

On November 15, 2019, Apple released a new Apple Music feature called Apple Music Replay, which is a year-end playlist showing users their favorite tracks of the entire year, a feature similar to Spotify Wrapped. On November 20, 2019, Apple introduced Apple Music for Business, offering customized playlists for partnered retailers, while also revealing that the platform's catalog now hosted over 60 million songs.

In 2020, Apple Music sealed deals with Universal Music Group, Sony Music and Warner Music Group for further promotion and streaming allowance of songs from artists on their labels. 

From October 30, 2020, Apple Music was included in the Apple One bundle along with several other Apple services such as News, iCloud, Arcade, and TV Plus.

On May 17, 2021, Apple announced that Apple Music would begin offering lossless audio via the ALAC codec in June 2021, along with music mixed in Dolby Atmos, all at no additional cost to Apple Music subscribers. In July 2021, the Android version of the app also received support for lossless and spatial audio with Dolby Atmos, though the features were not mentioned in the update release notes. By December 28, 2021, Apple Music had upgraded its entire catalogue of 90 million tracks to have lossless audio.

On September 22, 2022, Apple announced that it has signed a multi-year deal with the NFL to have Apple Music become the main sponsor of the Super Bowl halftime show beginning with Super Bowl LVII.

With the release of iOS 16.2 on December 13, 2022, Apple introduced the "Apple Music Sing" karaoke feature, which introduces real-time lyrics and a new slider which allows for the volume of vocals to be adjusted independently from a track's instrumentals on supported songs.

Apple Music Classical 
On August 13, 2021, Apple acquired classical music streaming service Primephonic, and announced that it would become the basis for a new Apple Music app dedicated to classical music, planned to launch in 2022. On March 9, 2023, Apple announced that Apple Music Classical would be available from March 28, 2023.

Apple Music Awards

Production library

Series

Feature films

Reception 
Apple Music received mixed reviews at launch. Among the criticism, reviewers wrote that the user interface was "not intuitive", and an "embarrassing and confusing mess". They also wrote about battery life problems. However, the service was praised for its smart functions. Christina Warren of Mashable noted the emphasis on human curation in Apple Music, pointing out the various human-curated radio stations and the accuracy of the curated playlists recommended to users in the "For Me" section. The author concluded saying "[The] For Me section alone has made me excited about music for the first time in a long time." Sam Machkovech of Ars Technica wrote that Apple's emphasis on unsigned artist participation in the Connect feature could be an effort to restore the company's former reputation as a "tastemaker" in the mid-2000s.

Apple Music's major redesign in iOS 10 received more positive reviews. Caitlin McGarry of Macworld praised Apple for having "cleaned up the clutter, reconsidered the navigation tools, put your library front and center, and added algorithmically created playlists to rival Spotify's." She noted bigger fonts, large amounts of white space, and she welcomed changes to various functionalities, concluding with the statement that "Apple Music’s redesign is a huge improvement over its previous incarnation, and a clear sign that Apple is listening to its customers". However, another Macworld editor, Oscar Raymundo, criticized the new design, writing that "Apple Music in iOS 10 is not as elegant or intuitive as Apple promised. The music service added more needless options, key actions like repeat got buried, and the For You section leaves a lot to be desired". Jordan Novet of VentureBeat wrote positively about the changes, stating "Apple has improved the overall design, as well as the experience".

In December 2017, singer-songwriter Neil Young released a new archive as part of his Neil Young Archives project and criticized Apple for the audio quality offered by its Apple Music streaming service, stating: "Apple Music controls the audio quality that is served to the masses and chooses to not make high quality available, reducing audio quality to between 5 percent and 20 percent of the master I made in the studio in all cases. So, the people hear 5 percent to 20 percent of what I created. ... Apple not offering a top-quality tier has led labels to stop making quality products available to the masses". Young's claim, however, did not stand up to technical scrutiny, with Apple delivering an industry-standard high-quality bitrate of 256kbit/s AAC, slightly edging out Spotify in quality, which uses a 320kbit/s Ogg Vorbis bitrate.

iCloud matching technology controversy 
The implementation of iCloud Music Library caused significant issues for users. There were reports about music libraries being impacted by issues such as tracks moved to other albums, album art not matching the music, duplicate artists and songs, missing tracks, and synchronization problems. Mashable wrote that "Apple has not yet publicly acknowledged the problem or responded to our request for comment".

iCloud Music Library has also been reported to delete music from users' local storage, though this has been disputed by other publications as caused by user error or another application. Additionally, the feature was reported to have replaced uploaded content with a version locked with digital rights management. In July 2016, Apple switched the matching technology to incorporate features identical to iTunes Match, specifically the use of "audio fingerprints" to scan sound data. The new technology also removed DRM from downloaded matched songs.

Album exclusives controversy 
In August 2016, Frank Ocean released Blonde exclusively on Apple Music. The decision was made by Ocean independently, without Def Jam Recordings, his former label, being a part of the deal. The exclusive deal reportedly "ignited a music streaming war". The move followed in the footsteps of other artists, including Adele, Coldplay, Future, Drake, Beyoncé, Rihanna, and Kanye West, who released albums on exclusive terms with music streaming competitors of leading service Spotify. Jonathan Prince, Spotify's head of communications, told The Verge that "We’re not really in the business of paying for exclusives, because we think they're bad for artists and they're bad for fans. Artists want as many fans as possible to hear their music, and fans want to be able to hear whatever they're excited about or interested in — exclusives get in the way of that for both sides. Of course, we understand that short promotional exclusives are common and we don't have an absolute policy against them, but we definitely think the best practice for everybody is wide release".

Ocean's independent move to Apple Music exclusivity caused "a major fight in the music industry", and Universal Music Group reportedly banned the practice of exclusive releases for its signed artists. Soon after, several major record labels followed Universal, marking a significant change in the industry. According to unnamed label executives, Spotify had also introduced a new policy that said that the service would not give the same level of promotion once an album arrives on Spotify after other services, including not being prominently featured in playlists. Rolling Stone wrote in October 2016 that "if you wanted to keep up with new albums by Beyoncé, Drake, Frank Ocean, and Kanye West, among many others, you would have had to subscribe to not one but two streaming services", adding, "But over the past few months, a backlash has developed against this new reality". Lady Gaga told Apple Music's Beats 1 radio, "I told my label that if they signed those contracts with Apple Music and Tidal, I'd leak all my own new music".

In May 2017, Apple Music executive Jimmy Iovine told Music Business Worldwide, "We tried it. We'll still do some stuff with the occasional artist. The labels don't seem to like it and ultimately it's their content."

See also 
 Apple Music 1 – Apple Music's live radio station
 iTunes Radio – Apple's discontinued free radio service within the Music app
 Comparison of on-demand music streaming services
 List of Internet radio stations
 List of online music databases

Footnotes

References

External links 
  – official site

Apple Inc. services
Internet radio in the United States
Music streaming services
Computer-related introductions in 2015
Internet properties established in 2015
Products introduced in 2015
IOS software
WatchOS software
TvOS software
American companies established in 2015